Amelia Island Wildlife Management Area, also referred to as Amelia Island, is a  tract of protected land located in Treasure County, Montana, owned and managed by the Montana Department of Fish, Wildlife and Parks (MFWP). The Wildlife Management area, located in the Yellowstone River, is used primarily in tandem with the nearby Amelia Island Fishing Access.

Flora and fauna
There is great variety in the species that can be found on the Island. Birds are found in abundance, with four different species observed, the great blue heron, red-tailed hawk, hairy woodpecker, and western wood pewee. In addition to avian species, white-tailed deer, meadow voles, eastern fox squirrels, and woodhouse's toads have also been observed in the management area.

References

External links
 Amelia Island Wildlife Management Area 2004 Small Mammal Trapping and Species Inventory Report at the Montana Fish, Wildlife and Parks Official Website

Wildlife management areas of the United States
Wildlife management areas of Montana
Protected areas of Montana
Geography of Treasure County, Montana